The PJSC United Aircraft Corporation (UAC) is a Russian aerospace and defense corporation. With a majority stake belonging to the Russian government, it consolidates Russian private and state-owned aircraft manufacturing companies and assets engaged in the manufacture, design and sale of military, civilian, transport, and unmanned aircraft. Its headquarters are in Krasnoselsky District, Central Administrative Okrug, Moscow.

Many of the corporation's assets are located in various regions in Russia, with joint-ventures with foreign partners in Italy, India and China.

History

Predecessor 
After the Soviet Union's sudden collapse in 1991, the aerospace industry of Russia was in turmoil. An excessive amount of imports and highly protective tariffs devastated the manufacturing industry, both the aerospace and the automotive industry. The military aircraft industry was able to benefit from improving export possibilities by profiting from a large storage of components and parts from Soviet times, while the civilian aircraft industry suffered losses and production of civilian aircraft diminished. For example, in 1990 Russia produced 715 aircraft. Eight years later that number decreased by 661 to only 56 aircraft. In 2000 only 4 civilian aircraft were produced. In order to solve this, the president of Russia at that time, Boris Yeltsin, decided that consolidation was necessary, and created the VPK-MAPO (Military Industrial Complex – Moscow Aircraft Production Association), which includes companies such as Mikoyan. The consolidation wasn't successful and MAPO later merged with Sukhoi.

First years 
The UAC was created on 20 February 2006 by Russian President Vladimir Putin in Presidential Decree No. 140 by merging shares from Ilyushin, Irkut, Mikoyan, Sukhoi, Tupolev, and Yakovlev as a new joint-stock company named the OJSC United Aircraft Corporation in order to optimize production and minimize losses. The UAC stated the reason why the corporation was created was to protect and develop the scientific and industrial potential of the Russian aircraft industry, the security and defense of the state, and the concentration of intellectual, industrial, and financial resources to implement long-term aviation programs. The United Aircraft Corporation started out producing the Tupolev Tu-154 "Careless", the Tupolev Tu-204, the Ilyushin Il-96, the Ilyushin Il-114, and all of Mikoyan, Sukhoi, Yakovlev, Tupolev, and Ilyushin military aircraft; all created prior to the corporation's creation.

In February 2007, the UAC presented its first aircraft and the first military aircraft designed and exported under the UAC brand, the Mikoyan MiG-35, designated by NATO as "Fulcrum-F" and a Generation 4++ jet fighter by Mikoyan. The MiG-35 was officially presented during the Aero India 2007 air show in Bangalore, India and officially unveiled when the Russian Minister of Defense, Sergei Ivanov, visited the Lukhovitsky Machine Building Plant "MAPO-MIG". The MiG-35 was a contender for its fourth generation counterparts in the Indian MRCA competition but was taken out of the competition in April 2011. The MiG-35 would be adopted by the Russian Air Force and was planned to be introduced in 2018.

In October 2007, the Federal Financial Markets Service registered a primary issue of common shares for the United Aircraft Building Corporation. The issue included 96,724,000,000 shares priced at 1 RUB (US$0.04). In December 2007, the second largest (and state-owned) Russian bank Vneshtorgbank (VTB) announced that it would sell its 5% share in EADS to UAC at market price. Later that month VTB sold its share in EADS to the state-owned Russian Development Bank (VEB). EADS already owns a 10% stake in Irkut which it plans to convert into UAC shares, leading to EADS and UAC owning shares of each other. They also announced plans for a possible 10–15% share issue in 2008, planning to retain a 75% stake. Currently, after placing 5 additional share issues, the Corporation's chartered capital amounts to 174.61 bln. RUB. The share of the Russian Federation in UAC's chartered capital is 80.29%.

In February 2008, the UAC brought out an improved version of the Sukhoi Su-27, the Sukhoi Su-35S, also called the Su-35BM, which was to serve as the interim aircraft for the upcoming Sukhoi PAK FA, Russia's first fifth generation jet fighter. This is the second modernized version of the Su-27, where the first modernized version took place back on 28 June 1988, designated as the Sukhoi Su-27M, also known as the Su-35. The improved aircraft includes a reinforced airframe, air-thrusted engines, radar, and improved avionics, while excluding canards and an air brake. The Russian Air Force designated them as the Su-35S and ordered 98 units with additional orders from China and Indonesia. Sukhoi thought sales of the Su-35S would go over 160 but they are blunted by updated versions of the Sukhoi Su-30.In May 2008, the UAC presented its third aircraft and the first airliner designed and exported under the UAC brand, the Sukhoi Superjet 100 (SSJ 100). The SSJ 100 is the fourth civilian aircraft and the first airliner to be made by Sukhoi. Before, Sukhoi and Boeing made a cooperation agreement and where Boeing consultants would help and advise Sukhoi on the airliner. The SSJ 100 was introduced on 21 April 2011, with Armavia. The Sukhoi Superjet 100 was later described as the most important and the most successful airliner program of the Russian aerospace industry, and is regarded by the Ministry of Industry and Trade as a top priority project. Sukhoi Holdings of the UAC signed a joint venture with Leonardo-Finmeccanica (now Leonardo S.p.A.) to establish Superjet International in order to sell the SSJ 100 to potential customers.

In October 2009, the UAC signed a joint venture with Hindustan Aeronautics Limited (HAL) of India named the Multirole Transport Aircraft Limited (MTAL) where the two companies would be cooperating on making aircraft for both of the Russian Armed Forces, the Indian Armed Forces, and friendly third-party countries. One of the projects being developed by the joint-venture is the Ilyushin Il-214 Multirole Transport Aircraft (MTA) which was intended to replace India's Antonov An-32 transport fleet. The Il-214 would perform regular transport duties as well as deploying paratroopers. The aircraft is planned to be revealed in 2017 and planned to be introduced in 2018.

In 2009, UAC delivered 90 aircraft, including 17 passenger models. This figure includes 31 MiG-29 and two Su-34 fighter jets produced for the Russian Air Force. The company's revenues for 2009 were expected to be 115 billion–120 billion rubles.

2010–2020

On 29 January 2010, Sukhoi and the UAC revealed Russia's first fifth generation jet fighter, the Sukhoi PAK FA (T-50). The PAK FA is a stealth, single-seat, twin-engine, multirole jet fighter designed for air supremacy and attack roles. The PAK FA would also be Russia's first aircraft to use stealth technology. The PAK FA is designed to replace the Mikoyan MiG-29 and the Sukhoi Su-27 and is expected to be introduced to the Russian Air Force in 2019. Also, under the MTAL joint venture, Sukhoi and HAL would co-develop the Sukhoi/HAL FGFA, now known as the Perspective Multirole Fighter (PMF), a variant of the PAK FA, of which would be designed for the Indian Air Force. On 11 August 2017, the Russian Air Force designated the Sukhoi PAK FA as the Sukhoi Su-57.

On 27 October 2010, the UAC and the Ukrainian state-owned aircraft corporation, Antonov, signed a joint venture contract, LLC UAC - Antonov, in the capital city of Ukraine, Kyiv. The purpose of the joint-venture was to deal with the coordination of Antonov and the UAC on purchasing spare parts, production, marketing and sales, as well as servicing and joint creation of new modifications of Antonov aircraft, according to Defense-Aerospace.

In 2013, nine aircraft repair plants of the Ministry of Defense was transferred under the ownership of the UAC. As a result, in 2014, the serviceability of the Russian Air Force increased from 40% to 65%.

As a result of Russian military intervention in Ukraine in 2014, international sanctions were put against Russia, and because the UAC was part of Russia's aerospace and defense industry, it was sanctioned as well by the European Union. However though, since the sanctions did not include the airliner industry of the UAC, such as the Sukhoi Superjet 100, exports of the regional jet to Western nations and economical activities of Superjet International will not be affected.

In April 2015, the company changed its full name to Public Joint-Stock Company (PJSC) "United Aircraft Corporation" (UAC). In 2011–2015, UAC companies delivered to the Russian Defence Ministry more than 200 aircraft.

On 28 September 2015, according to a resolution by the Ukrainian government, the state-owned corporation Antonov would be exiting the LLC UAC - Antonov joint venture between the two companies.

On 13 January 2016, India's HAL announced it would not be involved in the Ilyushin Il-214 MTA project anymore, and that Ilyushin would have to work on the project alone. The project is now designated as the "Ilyushin Il-214" with the MTA taken out since the project is no longer under the Multirole Transport Aircraft Limited joint-venture.

On 8 June 2016, UAC officially revealed the Irkut MC-21, its first medium-range jet airliner, when it rolled out in Irkutsk. The aircraft could be the first with an out of autoclave composite manufacturing for its wings. The goal of the MC-21 was to replace the Tupolev Tu-154, Tupolev Tu-134, Tupolev Tu-204, and the Yakovlev Yak-42. and to compete with the Airbus A320neo and the Boeing B737 MAX. Despite the domination of the airliner market by Boeing and Airbus as well as Russian protectionism preventing western companies to supply the program, the MC-21 was able to have its maiden flight on 28 May 2017, have 2 prototypes built and another 4 in assembly, and getting a total of 205 orders as of 24 July 2017, with an introduction planned in 2019 with Aeroflot.

On 25 June 2016, the UAC and the Chinese Government owned aircraft corporation, Comac, signed a joint venture contract, China-Russia Aircraft International Co, Ltd. (CRAIC), based in Shanghai. According to the UAC, CRAIC is responsible for product and technology development, manufacturing, marketing, sales and customer service, consulting, program management and other related field. The two companies are now cooperating in creating a new generation long range wide body commercial aircraft and to take charge of its operation under the joint-venture. This aircraft, now named the CRAIC CR-929, formerly the C929, would compete with the Airbus A330neo and the Boeing 787; thus challenging the Airbus-Boeing duopoly.

On 1 September 2017, the UAC Board of Directors, and UAC's subsidiaries, Sukhoi Civil Aircraft and the Irkut Corporation made an agreement to merge the civil industry Irkut Corporation and the Sukhoi Civil Aircraft into a Civil Aviation Division on the basis of Irkut Corporation. In accordance with the decisions taken, In turn, Sukhoi will become the financial basis of all civil aircraft produced by UAC. According to the UAC, corporate transformations were aimed to realize UAC's strategic goal to increase the share of civil products in its portfolio to 45% by 2035 and to drive annual civil aircraft production to 100-120 aircraft per year, as well as to increase UAC's economic effectiveness and lower costs by centralizing supporting processes and decreasing levels of management. The transformation will allow to concentrate resources to develop, manufacture and market Russian civil aircraft, it will also ensure consistency in these areas and simplify certification and licensing procedures.

On 9 July 2018, UAC was targeting 4.5% airliner market share by value and profitability by 2025, to grow its civil aircraft business from 17% to 40% of its income and to attract investors before 2035.

On 25 October 2018, the UAC was acquired from the Federal Agency for State Property Management by Russian state-owned conglomerate Rostec with a turnover cost in excess of one billion rubles (US$15 million). This would result in the entire national aviation assets being put in the hands of Rostec, as Rostec also owns the helicopter monopoly Russian Helicopters and the engine monopoly United Engine Corporation. Rostec had stated it was willing to invest up to 40 billion rubles into the MC-21, taking some burden away from the federal budget. The transfer was to be completed within 18 months.

2020-present

On 30 November 2021, the UAC board of directors approved the annexation to the corporation of both military aircraft producers Mikoyan and Sukhoi, previewed for 2022. The daily management of both is already made by UAC. In January 2022, UAC shareholders approved the annexation. As of 2022, UAC was 88 percent owned by Rostec.

On 22 March 2022, it was remarked that the Russian aviation industry was not even receiving imported parts already paid for as a result of the 2022 Russian invasion of Ukraine.

The company and its CEO Yury Slyusar were sanctioned by the British government on 24 February 2022, as it was judged to have aided in the Russian invasion of Ukraine.

The conglomerate finished the process of Mikoyan and Sukhoi absorption in June 2022. Relevant records were changed on June 1 in the United State Register of Legal Entities.

Organization

Company structure:

Aircraft manufacturers 
 Aviastar-SP
 Beriev
 Ilyushin
 Irkut Corporation
 Branch: Regional Aircraft-Branch of the Irkut Corporation (before:Sukhoi Civil Aircraft)
 Branch: Irkutsk Aviation Plant
 Branch: Yakovlev Design Bureau
 Myasishchev
 Mikoyan
 Branch: Sokol Plant
 Sukhoi
 Design Bureau
 Civil Aircraft (now acquired by Irkut Corporation)
 Branch: Komsomolsk-on-Amur Aircraft Production Association
 Branch: Novosibirsk Aircraft Production Association
 Tupolev
 Branch: Kazan Aircraft Production Association
 Voronezh Aircraft Production Association

Divisions 
 UAC Health
 UAC - Transport Aircraft
 LLC UAC - Aggregation Center

Financial and business 
 Finance Leasing Company
 Ilyushin Finance Co.
 LLC UAC - Purchases
 Sukhoi Holdings

Joint ventures 
 China-Russia Aircraft International Co, Ltd. (CRAIC)(with Comac)
 LLC UAC - Antonov (with Antonov, terminated in 2015)
 Mutilrole Transport Aircraft Limited (with Hindustan Aeronautics Limited)
 SuperJet International (with Leonardo S.p.A.); in May 2022, Italy's police froze assets of 146 million euros ($153 million) owned by Superjet International due to EU sanctions against Russia for its invasion of Ukraine.

Material providers 
 KAPO-Composit
 AeroComposit
 Ulyanovsk Branch

Others 
 Gromov Flight Research Institute

Products
This section contains present and future products to be distributed under UAC umbrella

Airliners
The United Aircraft Corporation started out producing the Tupolev Tu-154, the Tupolev Tu-204, the Ilyushin Il-86, the Ilyushin Il-96, and the Ilyushin Il-114; all created prior to the corporation's creation. The Tupolev Tu-154 is a medium-range, narrow-body, three-engine jet airliner developed and introduced in Soviet times. It saw large use in Aeroflot and was exported to many nations that had connections to the Soviet Union, and a total of 1,026 aircraft were built. Production of the Tu-154 stopped in 2013. Following a crash in 2016, all Russian Tu-154s were grounded, and now the airliner is in limited service by a few airline companies and military. The Ilyushin Il-86 is a short/medium-range, wide-body jet airliner, developed and introduced in Soviet times as well. The Ilyushin Il-86 was the first Soviet wide-body airliner and the world's second four-engine wide-body airliner developed. The Il-86 was praised for its safety and reliability, but only 106 were built, as a result of many delays during development. Production of the airliner stopped in 1995, and the airliner was retired in 2011, with only four in service in the Russian Air Force. The Ilyushin Il-96 is a shortened, long-ranged successor of the Il-86, with updated technologies, and the first airliner from the Russian Federation to be introduced. Only 30 were built however, and the airliner is in low-rate production and used by only a few airlines. The Il-96's purpose as an airliner ended in 2009, as it is deemed inferior to its Boeing and Airbus counterparts. The Tupolev Tu-204 is a medium-range, narrow-body jet airliner, featuring many technological innovations such as a fly-by-wire control system, a glass cockpit, etc., and was developed primarily for Aeroflot. The Tu-204 was succeeded by its variant, the Tu-214. The Ilyushin Il-114 is a turboprop, narrow-body regional airliner developed to replace the Antonov An-24, which most were in service of Aeroflot. However, only 20 had been built, and only two airlines were using it, so the Il-114's production was temporarily halted.

The Sukhoi Superjet 100 is the first airliner and regional jet airliner that is developed and exported under the UAC brand, by which it was developed by Sukhoi Civil Aircraft, a branch of the UAC. The Sukhoi Superjet 100 was designed to compete with the Antonov An-148, Embraer E-Jet, and the Bombardier CSeries, and to replace the aging Tupolev Tu-134 and the Yakovlev Yak-42 jet airliners, claimed by Sukhoi to have a lower purchase and operating cost. The Sukhoi Superjet 100 was later described as the most important and the most successful airliner program of the Russian aerospace industry, and is regarded by the Ministry of Industry and Trade as a top priority project. The Irkut MC-21 is currently the newest jet airliner developed under the UAC brand, of which it is developed by the Irkut Corporation, a brand of the UAC. The goal of the MC-21 is to replace the Tupolev Tu-154, Tupolev Tu-134, Tupolev Tu-204, and the Yakovlev Yak-42. and to compete with the Airbus A320neo and the Boeing B737 MAX. Despite the domination of the airliner market by Boeing and Airbus as well as Russian protectionism preventing western companies to supply the program, the MC-21 was able to have its maiden flight, have two prototypes built and another four in assembly, and getting a total of 366 orders as of 24 July 2017, with an introduction planned in 2019 with Aeroflot. The Sukhoi Superjet 130 is currently being developed by Sukhoi Civil Aircraft, intending to bridge the gap between the Superjet Stretch and the MC-21. The Ilyushin Il-114's production and development continued as the Ilyushin Il-114-300, now restarted with all-Russian parts with a maiden flight planned in 2019 and an introduction planned in 2021. The CRAIC CR-929 is developed under the CRAIC joint-venture between the UAC and Chinese aircraft corporation Comac, with the purpose being a wide-body jet airliner as well as to compete with the Boeing 787 and the Airbus A330neo.

Cargo
The United Aircraft Corporation started out producing the Ilyushin Il-96-400T and the Tupolev Tu-204C, both cargo variants of their airliner counterparts, and the Sukhoi Su-80, a twin-turboprop, twin-boom STOL aircraft. The Il-96-400T is a freight version of the Il-96-400, which features Russian avionics and engines and carries more room than the standard Il-96. The Sukhoi Su-80 can be used for both civilian and military purposes and has sleek hull which can provide space for 30 passengers and a "beaver-tail" ramp that can help unload cargo easier. The Su-80 was made by Sukhoi Civil Aircraft to replace the Antonov An-24/26, the Antonov An-28, and the Yakovlev Yak-40, and to compete with the Antonov An-38.

The Ilyushin Il-214 was formerly a project designated as the "Ilyushin Il-214 Multirole Transport Aircraft" under the joint-venture between the UAC and HAL. The project was first conceived in 2007, two to three years before the joint-venture, "Multirole Transport Aircraft Ltd." between the two state corporations were created, and development begun in 2012. However, the team under Ilyushin Aviation Complex, a branch of the UAC, and the team under HAL had many disagreements and misunderstandings. In January 2016, Ilyushin halted the project, and HAL announced it would not be involved in the Ilyushin Il-214 MTA project anymore, and that Ilyushin would have to work on the project alone. The project is now designated as the "Ilyushin Il-214" with the MTA taken out since the project is no longer under the Multirole Transport Aircraft Ltd. joint-venture. The Il-214 was later renamed the Il-276 in October 2017.

The Ilyushin Il-112 is a high-wing, light, military transport aircraft based on the Ilyushin Il-114 currently being developed by Ilyushin Aviation Complex for air landing and airdrop. Development of the aircraft started before 2011, the year of which the maiden flight of the Ilyushin Il-112 is supposed to occur. The project was later abandoned in May 2011 by the Russian Ministry of Defense and seven Antonov An-140T were purchased. The project was later continued in January 2013 and a maiden flight would be planned in 2017.

Special purposes
The Beriev Aircraft Company is a branch of the UAC that specializes in special purposed and amphibious aircraft. The Beriev Be-200 "Altair", based on the Beriev A-40 "Albatross", was designed prior to the UAC's creation, and is a multi-purposed amphibious aircraft. The Be-200 is marketed as a firefighter, search and rescue aircraft, maritime patrol aircraft, cargo aircraft, and an airliner. The Beriev A-100 is an airborne early warning and control aircraft designed to replace the Beriev A-50, also made by Beriev. Its maiden flight was on 26 October 2016, with an introduction with the Russian Air Force. The A-100 is developed from the Ilyushin Il-476 with avionics and configuration being similar to the A-50U as well as a new active phased array radar made by JSC Vega.

Military
Most of the military aircraft produced by the UAC were designed prior to the corporation's creation, many of them designed in the Soviet era. Jet fighters such as the Sukhoi Su-25 "Grach", Sukhoi Su-27 "Sofiyka", Mikoyan MiG-29, Sukhoi Su-33, Sukhoi Su-30, and the Sukhoi Su-34, and large military aircraft such as the Ilyushin Il-76, Tupolev Tu-160 "Beliy Lebed", and the Ilyushin Il-78, were all designed in the Soviet Union. However though, some Soviet aircraft such as the Tupolev Tu-160 "Beliy Lebed", Sukhoi Su-33, Sukhoi Su-30, and the Sukhoi Su-34, were introduced later in the Russian Federation, the Soviet Union's successor. The Yakovlev Yak-130 is the only aircraft to be developed after the Soviet era and before the creation of the UAC.

The Mikoyan MiG-35 is the first aircraft and the first military aircraft designed and exported under the UAC brand, as Mikoyan, the company that designed it, is a branch of the corporation. The MiG-35 was a contender for its fourth generation counterparts in the Indian MRCA competition but was taken out of the competition in April 2011. The MiG-35 would be adopted by the Russian Air Force and is planned to be introduced in 2018. The Sukhoi Su-35S, the UAC's second military aircraft, is designed by the Sukhoi Design Bureau, a branch of the UAC. The aircraft is to serve as the interim for the Sukhoi PAK FA, Russia's first fifth-generation jet fighter. This is the second modernized version of the Su-27, where the first modernized version took place back on 28 June 1988, designated as the Sukhoi Su-27M, also known as the Su-35. The improved aircraft includes a reinforced airframe, air-thrusted engines, radar, and improved avionics, while excluding canards and an air brake. The Russian Air Force designated them as the Su-35S and ordered 98 units with additional orders from China and Indonesia. Sukhoi thought sales of the Su-35S would go over 160 but they are blunted by updated versions of the Sukhoi Su-30. 30 Tupolev Tu-22M3 bombers would be upgraded to the Tupolev Tu-22M3M with advanced avionics, ability to use air-to-surface weaponry, hardware components, and adapted for extended ranged weaponry. The first flight is scheduled in August 2018. Remaining Tupolev Tu-22M3 bombers would be undergoing modernization.

The Sukhoi PAK FA, designated by the Russian Air Force as the Sukhoi Su-57, under the Prospective Airborne Complex (PAK) platform, would be the first Russian aircraft to use stealth technology, as well as being Russia's first fifth-generation jet fighter, as stated before. The Sukhoi Su-57 would replace the aging Sukhoi Su-27 and the Mikoyan MiG-29 in the Russian Air Force with an introduction planned in 2019. Other aircraft being developed under the PAK platform are the Ilyushin PAK TA, a supersonic transport aircraft, the Tupolev PAK DA, a strategic bomber, the Sukhoi PAK ShA, a close air support aircraft designed to replace the Sukhoi Su-25, and the Mikoyan PAK DP, a new fast interceptor aircraft. Military aircraft that are not under the PAK platform and are under development are the Mikoyan MiG-41 and the Mikoyan LMFS.

At the MAKS 2021 Air show UAC announced that the Mikoyan LMFS project was developed into the Sukhoi LFS.

All of the aircraft listed were either put into or going into service in the Russian Air Force.

Corporate governance

Board of Directors 

 Denis Manturov (Chairman since July 2015)
 Yury Slyusar (President since January 2015)
 Boris Alyoshin (Advisor to the President of UAC on Science and Technology since May 2015)
 Vladimir Potapov (Independent Director since June 2017)
Yury Borisov
 Valery Okulov
 Andrey Ivanov
 Evgeniy Yelin
 Anatoly Serdyukov 
 Ivan Kharchenko
 Evgeny Jurchenko

Chairman 
 2006–2015: Sergei Ivanov
 2015–present: Denis Manturov

President 
According to the UAC, the President is the sole executive body of PJSC UAC with functions of the Chairman of the Management Board. The President is empowered to decide all issues pertaining to the Corporation's current activities, except for matters falling within the competence of the General Shareholders' Meeting, the Board of Directors and the Management Board.
 Before January 2015: Alexei Fyodorov
 January 2015–present: Yury Slyusar

Management Board 
 President: Yury Slyusar
 Member: Demchenko Oleg Fedorovich

Vice Presidents 
 First Vice President: Alexander Tulyakov
 Vice President for State Defense Order and Service Support of State Aviation Aircraft: Alexander Bobryshev
 Vice President for special-purpose aviation: Sergey Gerasimov
 Vice President of Economics and Finance: Demidov Alexey
 Vice President for Security: Koval Artur
 Vice President of special purpose and strategic aviation: Konyukhov Alexander
 Vice President for Innovations: Sergey Korotkov
 Vice President of Civil Aviation: Vladislav Masalov
 Vice President for Military Aviation: Igor Ozar
 Vice President - Head of the Office: Alexander Skokov
 Vice President for Production: Sergey Yurasov
 Former member: Alexey Rogozin

See also 

 Aircraft industry of Russia
 Companies similar to the UAC
 Airbus
 Aviation Industry Corporation of China
 Boeing
 BAE Systems
 Lockheed Martin
 Russian Helicopters
 List of companies of Russia

References

External links
Official Website

 
Aircraft manufacturers of Russia
Government-owned companies of Russia
Companies listed on the Moscow Exchange
Russian companies established in 2006
Aerospace companies of Russia
Defence companies of Russia
Russian brands
Holding companies of Russia
Manufacturing companies established in 2006